The Philadelphia Phillies are a Major League Baseball team based in Philadelphia, Pennsylvania. They  are a member of the Eastern Division of Major League Baseball's National League. The team has played officially under two names since beginning play between 1882 and 1883: the current moniker, as well as the "Quakers", which was used in conjunction with "Phillies" during the team's early history. The team was also known unofficially as the "Blue Jays" during the World War II era. Since the franchise's inception,  players have made an appearance in a competitive game for the team, whether as an offensive player (batting and baserunning) or a defensive player (fielding, pitching, or both).

Of those  Phillies, 114 have had surnames beginning with the letter W,  8 beginning with the letter Y, and 7 beginning with the letter Z; there has never been a Phillies player, nor a player in Major League Baseball history, whose surname begins with the letter X. Two have been inducted into the Baseball Hall of Fame: center fielder Lloyd Waner, who was a Phillie during the 1942 season; and left fielder Hack Wilson, who played for Philadelphia in 1934. One member of this list has been elected to the Philadelphia Baseball Wall of Fame; center fielder Cy Williams played 13 seasons for the Phillies, leading the National League in home runs three times in that span.

Among the 70 batters in this list, catcher Matt Walbeck has the highest batting average, at 1.000; he notched a hit in his only at-bat with Philadelphia. Other players with an average above .300 include Charlie Waitt (.333 in one season), Curt Walker (.311 in four seasons), Harry Walker (.339 in two seasons), Phil Weintraub (.311 in one season), Pinky Whitney (.307 in ten seasons), and Williams (.306). Williams also leads this list in home runs, with 217, and runs batted in (RBI), with 795. Among the players whose surnames start with Y and Z, Charlie Yingling (.250) and Charlie Ziegler (.273) have the highest averages; Del Young and Todd Zeile lead their respective lists in home runs and RBI.

Of this list's 59 pitchers, four share the best win–loss record, in terms of winning percentage; Fred Wenz won two games and lost none in his Phillies career, while Bob Wells, Deke White, and Mike Zagurski each earned a win in their only decisions. Rick Wise leads all members of this list in victories (75) and defeats (76), and is one of ten Phillies pitchers to throw a no-hitter, accomplishing the feat on June 23, 1971. Randy Wolf leads in strikeouts, having thrown 971 in his eight-season Phillies career. The earned run average (ERA) leaders are Huck Wallace and Dan Warthen; each amassed a 0.00 ERA by allowing no earned runs in their Phillies careers. One position player, right fielder Glenn Wilson, also sports a 0.00 ERA after his only pitching appearance with Philadelphia. Among players who have allowed runs, Billy Wagner's 1.86 ERA is best. Leaders among the Y- and Z-named pitchers include Floyd Youmans (1 win, 5.70 ERA, 20 strikeouts), Zagurski (36 strikeouts), and Tom Zachary (4.26 ERA).

One player, Bucky Walters, has made 30% or more of his Phillies appearances as a pitcher and a position player. He amassed a 38–53 pitching record with a 4.48 ERA while batting .260 with seven home runs as a third baseman.

Footnotes
Key
 The National Baseball Hall of Fame and Museum determines which cap a player wears on their plaque, signifying "the team with which he made his most indelible mark". The Hall of Fame considers the player's wishes in making their decision, but the Hall makes the final decision as "it is important that the logo be emblematic of the historical accomplishments of that player's career".
 Players are listed at a position if they appeared in 30% of their games or more during their Phillies career, as defined by Baseball-Reference.com. Additional positions may be shown on the Baseball-Reference website by following each player's citation.
 Franchise batting and pitching leaders are drawn from Baseball-Reference.com. A total of 1,500 plate appearances are needed to qualify for batting records, and 500 innings pitched or 50 decisions are required to qualify for pitching records.
 Statistics are correct as of the end of the 2010 Major League Baseball season.

Table
Matt Walbeck is listed by Baseball-Reference as a catcher, but never appeared in a game in the field for the Phillies.
Walt Walsh is listed by Baseball-Reference without a position; he never appeared in a game in the field in his major league career.
Turner Ward is listed by Baseball-Reference as an outfielder, but never appeared in a game in the field for the Phillies.
Jim Westlake is listed by Baseball-Reference without a position; he never appeared in a game in the field in his major league career.
Wally Westlake is listed by Baseball-Reference as an outfielder and third baseman, but never appeared in a game in the field for the Phillies.
Bert Yeabsley is listed by Baseball-Reference without a position; he never appeared in a game in the field in his major league career.

References
General

Inline citations

W